The Wheao River is a river of the Bay of Plenty region of New Zealand's North Island. An upper tributary of the Rangitaiki River, it flows predominantly north through the Kaingaroa Forest to reach the Rangitaiki south of Murupara.

See also
List of rivers of New Zealand

References

Rivers of the Bay of Plenty Region
Rivers of New Zealand